Noah Baxpöhler (born 13 August 1993) is a German volleyball player for SVG Lüneburg and the German national team.

He participated at the 2017 Men's European Volleyball Championship.

Sporting achievements

National team
 2017  European Championship

References

1993 births
Living people
German men's volleyball players
People from Ahlen
Sportspeople from Münster (region)
21st-century German people